The  Washington Redskins season was the franchise's 26th season in the National Football League (NFL) and their 21st in Washington, D.C. the team failed to improve on their 6–6 record from 1956 and finished 5-6-1.

Offseason

NFL Draft

Regular season

Schedule

Standings

References

Washington
Washington Redskins seasons
Washing